Irén Zságot (8 February 1924 – 26 January 1999) was a Hungarian diver. She competed in the Women's 10 metre platform event at the 1948 Summer Olympics.

References

External links
 

1924 births
1999 deaths
Hungarian female divers
Olympic divers of Hungary
Divers at the 1948 Summer Olympics
Divers from Budapest
Sportspeople from Budapest